Bernd Maier (born 30 November 1974) is a German former footballer who played as a defensive midfielder. He played in the Bundesliga with SSV Ulm 1846.

References

Living people
1974 births
People from Heidenheim (district)
Sportspeople from Stuttgart (region)
Footballers from Baden-Württemberg
German footballers
Association football midfielders
SSV Ulm 1846 players
1. FC Saarbrücken players
VfR Aalen players
1. FC Heidenheim players
Bundesliga players
2. Bundesliga players
3. Liga players
Regionalliga players
Oberliga (football) players